Progressive osseous heteroplasia is a cutaneous condition characterized by cutaneous or subcutaneous ossification.

According to the Progressive Osseous Heteroplasia Association:

It is associated with GNAS.

A telltale symptom of POH is osteoma cutis under the skin of a newborn. It was discovered in 1994 by physician Frederick Kaplan.

Diagnosis
Patients with POH have a distinctly different manifestation of symptoms than those with fibrodysplasia ossificans progressiva (FOP), though heterotopic ossification appears in both diseases. They lack the congenital abnormality of the big toe that is a diagnostic feature for FOP. People with POH also have ossification of the skin during infancy, which does not occur in FOP. Also, the pattern of ossification differs in POH, spreading in an intramembranous fashion rather than endochondral.

See also 
 Fibrodysplasia ossificans progressiva
 Punctate porokeratosis
 List of cutaneous conditions
 Pseudopseudohypoparathyroidism

References

External links 

Genodermatoses
Skeletal disorders